Hénu is a commune in the Pas-de-Calais department in the Hauts-de-France region of France.

Geography

Population

Places of interest
 The eighteenth-century chateau built by the de Coupigny family in 1745. It was seized during the French Revolution and used as a chicory factory.
 The church of St. Nicholas, dating from the eighteenth century.
 The Commonwealth War Graves Commission cemetery.

See also
 Communes of the Pas-de-Calais department

References

External links

 The CWGC cemetery

Communes of Pas-de-Calais